Fredriksen   is a  Norwegian patronymic surname  which may refer to:

People
Aslaug Fredriksen (1918-2000),  Norwegian politician
Britt Fredriksen (born 1945), Norwegian Playmate
Jan-Henrik Fredriksen (1956-2020), Norwegian politician
John Fredriksen (born 1944), Norwegian oil tanker and shipping tycoon
Jon André Fredriksen (born 1982), Norwegian footballer
Kitty Petrine Fredriksen (1910- 2003), Norwegian politician
Lars A. Fredriksen, Norwegian pop singer
Mark Fredriksen (1936-2011), French extreme political right figure in 1960s to the 2000s and founder of a movement 
Oskar Fredriksen (cross-country skier), Norwegian cross country skier
Oskar Fredriksen (speed skater) (1872–1920), Norwegian speed skater 
Paula Fredriksen (born 1951), American scholar
Sigurd Fredriksen, (1907-1986), French painter
Trond Fredriksen (born 1977), Norwegian footballer
Yngvar Fredriksen(1887–1958), Norwegian gymnast

Other
Carl Fredriksens Transport, code name for an operation during the occupation of Norway by Nazi Germany
Fredriksen Island, South Orkney Islands, near Antarctica 

Norwegian-language surnames
Patronymic surnames
Surnames from given names